Calceby is a small village in the East Lindsey district of Lincolnshire, England. Once much larger, Calceby is recorded in the Domesday Book as "Calesbi". Lord of the Manor in 1086 was Earl Hugh of Chester. By the early seventeenth century, the conversion of agriculture from corn to pasture had begun a process of depopulation of the parish.

In 1638 the vicar said that his meagre income from tithes (£13 16s 6d per annum) could only be increased if the village were to be repopulated. The parish church of St Andrew is now in ruins, the last service to take place there being in 1692. Maurice Beresford included Calceby in his "Lost Villages of England".

Calceby Beck & Spring are the source of the Great Eau, and are part of the local network of Chalk Streams.

Calceby Marsh has been designated a Site of Special Scientific Interest (SSSI) as "an outstanding example of base-rich marsh". The site consists of three areas of marshland, each differing slightly in species composition and surrounded by grassland of value to breeding snipe and lapwing.

Calceby Marsh SSSI is owned by the Diocese of Lincoln

References

External links

East Lindsey District
Villages in Lincolnshire
Sites of Special Scientific Interest in Lincolnshire